Without Fear is the debut studio album by Irish singer-songwriter Dermot Kennedy, released on 4 October 2019 by Riggins Recording, Interscope Records and Island Records. It has spawned four singles, including "Power Over Me" and "Outnumbered".

Background 
Kennedy announced the album on 13 June 2019, which coincided with the release of "Outnumbered". Pre-orders started that day, with an original release date of 27 September set. Kennedy revealed the track list on 9 September 2019. On 24 June 2020 a new single, "Giants", was released and added to the digital version of the album as the opening track.

Chart performance
Without Fear debuted at number one on the Irish Albums Chart with sales of 7,000 units, becoming the fastest-selling album of 2019. It has spent 154 weeks in the top 10, including 27 non-consecutive weeks at the top of the chart as of 12 March 2021. In the UK the album debuted at number one with sales of 20,061 units, marking Kennedy's first number one outside Ireland.

Track listing 
Track listing and credits adapted from Kennedy's Instagram, as well as Apple Music and ASCAP.

Charts

Weekly charts

Year-end charts

Certifications

Release history

References 

2019 debut albums
Dermot Kennedy albums
Interscope Records albums
Island Records albums